Indian Queens is a village in Cornwall, England.

Indian Queens may also refer to:

"Indian Queens," a song by Nick Lowe from his 2001 album The Convincer
Indians in the New York City metropolitan region

See also
Indian Queen (disambiguation)